Shockwave is an American documentary television series that premiered on November 30, 2007, on History. The program compiles video footage and eyewitness accounts to the headline making events and attempts to educate the viewer as to what really happened in a particular event.

The show depicts the United Airlines Flight 232 crash, USS Forrestal fire, the Killdozer, the Mount Hood hiking incident, the deadly Ramstein airshow disaster, and the PEPCON disaster.

The toolbox of resources which the show employs to perform this task include the following items:
Video footage
Photographs
3-D renderings (computer-generated imagery) of the event
Eyewitness accounts (testimony/interviews)
Participant accounts (interviews)

Each episode has typically four, five or six stories (or events). For each, people who witnessed the event or who were involved in the event are interviewed, video footage and photos of the event are shown, and 3-D renderings of the event are shown.

Episodes

Season 1 (2007-2008)

Season 2 (2008) 

*denotes lack of info for show due to unavailability of episode

Reception
Common Sense Media rated the show 3 out of 5 stars.

See also
World's Most Amazing Videos
Seconds From Disaster
Critical Situation
Destroyed in Seconds
Most Daring

References

External links
Shockwave official website

2000s American documentary television series
History (American TV channel) original programming
2007 American television series debuts